Elachista inopina is a moth of the family Elachistidae that is found in California.

The forewings are broad. The basal 1/4 of the costa is brownish grey. The ground colour is white, with some scattered brown-tipped scales especially in the distal part of the wing, and forming an indistinct spot in the middle at the fold and another similar spot at 3/4 of the wing. The hindwings are grey and the underside of the wings is also grey.

Etymology
The species name is derived from Latin inopinus (meaning unexpected).

References

inopina
Endemic fauna of California
Moths of North America
Moths described in 1997
Fauna without expected TNC conservation status